Adventures of Lolo 2 is a puzzle video game released in 1990 by HAL Laboratory for the Nintendo Entertainment System. It is the seventh installment of the Japanese Eggerland video game series; it was the fourth game released in European countries and the second one released in the United States and Canada; it was never released in Japan.

Like its American predecessor, it is a collection of puzzles from Eggerland: Meikyū no Fukkatsu and Eggerland: Sōzō he no Tabidachi, plus some puzzles from the Japanese Adventures of Lolo. The American game also re-used cut-scenes and graphics from the Japanese one.

The Japan-exclusive Adventures of Lolo, on the other hand, is a different game, consisting entirely of original puzzles. It was released for the Famicom and it is the sixth installment in the Eggerland series.

The Japanese Adventures of Lolo  was released on the Wii's Virtual Console in Japan on June 5, 2007. It was later released in Japan on the 3DS Virtual Console on April 9, 2014, on the Wii U's Virtual Console on September 3 the same year and via Nintendo Switch Online on December 12, 2018.

The American Adventures of Lolo 2 was released on the Wii's Virtual Console in 2008 for North America on January 21, and in PAL regions on February 1.

Gameplay

Gameplay is virtually identical to the previous Adventures of Lolo (US), since both are compilations of puzzles from Eggerland: Meikyū no Fukkatsu and Eggerland: Sōzō he no Tabidachi. Some of the monster graphics were drawn differently, mainly Gol, Rocky, Skull, Medusa, and Don Medusa. Other differences include new puzzles and greater difficulty.

The game features a total of 50 different puzzle rooms; the player faces King Egger at the end. Also featured are four hidden Pro puzzle rooms, which are available for players who want to try very challenging rooms.

The Japan-only Adventures of Lolo has mostly different and more difficult levels compared to the North American and European collection.

Notes

References

External links
Info on HAL Laboratory's website

Eggerland Project - Complete information on the Eggerland series as well as custom-made Eggerland games.
Hardcore Gaming 101: Eggerland / Adventures of Lolo - An English article about the Eggerland series and all its games.

1990 video games
Nintendo Entertainment System games
HAL Laboratory games
Puzzle video games
Video game sequels
Video games developed in Japan
Virtual Console games for Wii
Virtual Console games for Nintendo 3DS
Virtual Console games for Wii U
Single-player video games
Nintendo Switch Online games